Ryan Michael Bollinger (born February 4, 1991) is an American professional baseball pitcher for the Rakuten Monkeys of the Chinese Professional Baseball League (CPBL). He previously played in the CPBL for the Fubon Guardians. In 2018, he was promoted to the major leagues by the New York Yankees, but he did not appear in a game, making him a phantom ballplayer.

Career
Born in Apple Valley, California, Bollinger attended Minot High School in Minot, North Dakota, where he played for the baseball team. He committed to attend Iowa Western Community College to play college baseball.

Philadelphia Phillies
The Philadelphia Phillies selected Bollinger in the 47th round, with the 1,247th overall selection, of the 2009 MLB draft as a first baseman, and he signed rather than enroll in college. Bollinger never appeared in a game for the Phillies organization and was released on June 15, 2010.

Windy City ThunderBolts
In July 2010, Bollinger signed with the Windy City ThunderBolts of the Frontier League, an independent baseball league, in 2010 as a pitcher. He did not allow a run in 6.0 innings pitched for the club.

Chicago White Sox
On October 7, 2010, the Chicago White Sox purchased his contract. In 2011, Bollinger spent the year with the rookie ball Bristol White Sox, registering a 5-2 record and 4.23 ERA in 12 appearances. In 2012, Bollinger again spent the year in rookie ball, this time for the Great Falls Voyagers, and pitched to a 4-3 record and 3.56 ERA in 17 games for the club. In 2013, Bollinger played for the Single-A Kannapolis Intimidators, recording a 3.17 ERA with 52 strikeouts in 29 games. On March 25, 2014, Bollinger was released by the White Sox organization.

St. Paul Saints
Bollinger signed with the St. Paul Saints of the American Association of Independent Professional Baseball for the 2014 season. In 7 games out of the bullpen for the club, he registered a 13.50 ERA and 3 strikeouts.

Trois-Rivières Aigles
Bollinger then signed with the Trois-Rivières Aigles of the Canadian American Association of Professional Baseball, and went 4-7 with a 4.73 ERA in 13 games for the team.

Winnipeg Goldeyes
On August 15, 2014, Bollinger was traded to the Winnipeg Goldeyes of the American Association of Independent Professional Baseball. He made 4 appearances for Winnipeg, pitching to a 3-0 record with 11 strikeouts.

Trois-Rivières Aigles (second stint)
On September 23, 2014, Bollinger was traded back to the Trois-Rivières Aigles. In 2015 for the club, Bollinger pitched to a 11-7 record and 3.68 ERA with 108 strikeouts in 20 appearances. In 2016 for the Aigles, Bollinger recorded a 2-11 record and 4.87 ERA in 22 appearances.

Haar Disciples
On February 1, 2017, Bollinger signed with the Haar Disciples, and played in the Bundesliga in Germany. After the season, he was named the best pitcher of the Southern League. Bollinger pitched to a 10-1 record and 0.76 ERA, and allowed only 12 walks in 106.0 innings pitched. He also broke the Bundesliga single-season strikeout record, with his 178 strikeouts on the year being 14 more than the previous record.

He also pitched for the Brisbane Bandits of the Australian Baseball League during the 2017–18 season. He returned to the Bandits for the 2018–19 season.

New York Yankees
On December 16, 2017, Bollinger signed a minor league contract with the New York Yankees organization. He began the 2018 season with the Scranton/Wilkes-Barre RailRiders of the Class AAA International League, where he pitched in two games, and then pitched for the Trenton Thunder of the Class AA Eastern League. The Yankees promoted Bollinger to the major leagues on May 23, and optioned him back to Trenton the next day, without Bollinger making his major league debut. He was outrighted to Trenton on May 27, removing him from the Yankees' 40-man roster. He was then added to the 25-man roster on July 31. He optioned to Trenton on August 1, and designated for assignment on September 1. He returned to Scranton/Wilkes-Barre. Bollinger declared free agency on October 8, 2018.

San Diego Padres
On November 26, 2018, Bollinger signed a minor-league contract with the San Diego Padres that included an invitation to spring training. He was released by the Padres on March 27, 2019.

Fubon Guardians
On June 5, 2019, Bollinger signed with the Fubon Guardians of the Chinese Professional Baseball League. Bollinger registered a 4.31 ERA with 127 strikeouts in 108.2 innings, including a 10-strikeout shutout game on June 16, 2019. He re-signed with the team for the 2020 season. He did not play in a game in 2020 due to a nagging foot injury and was released on August 6, 2020.

Rakuten Monkeys
On December 15, 2020, Bollinger signed with the Rakuten Monkeys of the Chinese Professional Baseball League for the 2021 season. He signed a contract with the Monkeys for the 2022 season on December 28, 2021.

See also
Phantom ballplayer

References

External links

1991 births
Living people
American expatriate baseball players in Australia
American expatriate baseball players in Canada
American expatriate sportspeople in Germany
American expatriate baseball players in Taiwan
Baseball pitchers
Baseball players from Minnesota
Baseball players from North Dakota
Baseball first basemen
Brisbane Bandits players
Bristol White Sox players
Great Falls Voyagers players
Florida Complex League Phillies players
Kannapolis Intimidators players
People from Apple Valley, California
People from Minot, North Dakota
Rakuten Monkeys players
Scranton/Wilkes-Barre RailRiders players
St. Paul Saints players
Trenton Thunder players
Trois-Rivières Aigles players
Windy City ThunderBolts players
Winnipeg Goldeyes players